Sébastien Faure (6 January 1858 – 14 July 1942) was a French anarchist, freethought and secularist activist and a principal proponent of synthesis anarchism.

Biography 

Before becoming a free-thinker, Faure was a seminarist. He engaged in politics as a socialist before turning to anarchism in 1888.

In 1894, he was prosecuted in "The Trial of the thirty" ("Procès des trente"), but was acquitted. That same year, he became the guardian of Sidonie Vaillant after the execution of her father, Auguste Vaillant. In 1895, he cofounded "Le Libertaire" with Louise Michel, taking the name of the earlier journal by Joseph Déjacque. At the time of the Dreyfus affair, he was one of the leading supporters of Alfred Dreyfus. In 1904, he created a libertarian school, La Ruche ("The Hive"), close to Rambouillet. In 1916, he launched the periodical "Ce qu'il faut dire". Faure also co-founded (with Volin) the Synthesis, or also known as synthesis anarchism which was an influential form of conceiving anarchist federations.

Bibliography

He is recognized for his pedagogy and his qualities as a speaker, and is the author of several books:

 The universal pain (1895)
 My Communism (1921)
 The Forces Of The Revolution (1921)
 Religious imposture (1923)
 Subversive remarks
 Twelve Proofs of God's Inexistence (1908)

He was also the founder of the Anarchist encyclopedia, as well as the namesake of the Sébastien Faure Century, the French-speaking contingent of the Durruti Column during the civil war in Spain.

Synthesis anarchism 

The discussion about the Anarchist Synthesis arises in the context of the discussion on the Organisational Platform of the Libertarian Communists, written by the Dielo Truda group of Russian exiles in 1926.

Two texts made as responses to the Platform, each proposing a different organizational model, became the basis for what is  known as the organisation of synthesis, or simply "synthesism".
Volin published in 1924 a paper calling for "the anarchist synthesis" and was also the author of the article in Sébastien Faure's Encyclopedie Anarchiste on the same topic. The main purpose behind the synthesis was that the anarchist movement in most countries was divided into three main tendencies: communist anarchism, anarcho-syndicalism, and individualist anarchism and so such an organization could contain anarchists of these three tendencies very well.

The platformists wanted to push their ideas forward through organizing an international anarchist congress on 12 February 1927. Shortly later in the National Congress of the French Anarchist Union (UAF), the Dielo Truda Group achieved making their platform more popular and so they made the UAF change its name into Revolutionary Anarcho-Communist Union (UACR). Sébastien Faure led a faction within the UACR that decided to separate themselves from this organization and form outside it the Association of Federalist Anarchists (AFA), thinking that traditional anarchist ideas were being threatened by the Dielo Truda platform. Shortly later in his text "Anarchist synthesis" he exposes the view that "these currents were not contradictory but complementary, each having a role within anarchism: anarcho-syndicalism as the strength of the mass organisations and the best way for the practice of anarchism; libertarian communism as a proposed future society based on the distribution of the fruits of labour according to the needs of each one; anarcho-individualism as a negation of oppression and affirming the individual right to development of the individual, seeking to please them in every way." Sebastian Faure had strong contacts in Spain and so his proposal had more impact with Spanish anarchists than the Dielo Truda platform even though individualist anarchist influence in Spain was less strong than it was in France. The main goal there was reconciling anarcho-communism with anarcho-syndicalism.

Selected works 

 The Anarchist Synthesis (1927)
 Revolutionary Forces (1921)
 Twelve Proofs of the Inexistence of God

See also 
Anarchism in France

References

External links

 Articles by Sébastien Faure on Marxists.org
 Sébastien Faure page at the Daily Bleed's Anarchist Encyclopedia.
 The anarchist encyclopedia Volume 1 Volume 2 Volume 3 Volume 4
 Faure Archive at the Anarchy Archives.
 The Revolutionary Forces by Sebastien Faure
 Sébastien Faure French Freethinker, Secularist, and Proponent of Synthesis Anarchism, at RevoltLib.com
 

1858 births
1942 deaths
Anarcho-communists
Politicians from Saint-Étienne
French anarchists
Synthesis anarchism
French socialists
Freethought writers
French atheism activists